Reidun is an Old Norse name for girls and women, mostly given in Norway. The name Reidun consists of the elements Hreiðr, meaning house and unnr, sometimes translated as to wave. Another translation for unnr would be elska, meaning to love. The first part of the name, Hreiðr, can also be translated with nest. With the last 2 translations the name Reidun would refer to a woman who loves her home or nest.

Reidun was most popular as a name in the 1930s and 1940s  There are 9195 women in Norway who have Reidunn as their first name. The name Reidun has only rarely been given as a first name in the 21st century. The name is sometimes spelled as Reidunn. In Sweden the name Reidun has become rare, so it is far below the top 100 list of women's names in Sweden.

Notable people called Reidunn

Reidun is a given name for girls and women. Notable people with the given name include:

Reidun Andersson (1922–1992), Norwegian politician
Reidun Andreassen (born 1936), Norwegian politician
Reidun Brusletten (born 1936), Norwegian politician 
Reidun Gravdahl (born 1948), Norwegian politician
Reidun Gunnarson, Norwegian handball player
Reidun Røed (1921–2009), Norwegian resistance member
Reidun Seth (born 1966), Norwegian footballer
Reidun Tatham (born 1978), Canadian synchronized swimmer

References

External links
For more information in English about the name Reidun you could read this website: 
 Reidun on 'Behind the name' website

For more information in Norwegian about the name Reidun you could read this website: 
  Reidun on 'Store norske leksikon'/Big Norwegian Dictionary article written by Gulbrand Alhaug from Arctic University in Tromsø

Old Norse personal names